Bashkortostan has participated in the Turkvision Song Contest twice since its debut in .  The Bashkir broadcaster, Kuray Television (KTV),was the organiser of the Bashkir entry from 2013 to 2014, in 2015 Tugan Tel TV replaced Kuray Television . In 2013, Bashkortostan's first entry at Turkvision, Diana Ishniyazova, failed to qualify to the grand final.

History

2013

Bashkortostan made their debut in the Turkvision Song Contest 2013 festival, in Eskişehir, Turkey.  The Bashkir broadcaster Kuray Television organised the entry selection, which took place on 16 November 2013. A total of 17 singers participated in the national selection. However, the national final was disrupted due to a fire breaking out at the venue during the show. Approximately 1,000 in attendance were evacuated to safety, and as a result, the national final was rescheduled to a later date.

The national selection was rescheduled for 5 December 2013. 17 artists participated, with Diana Ishniyazova being selected to represent Bashkortostan. At the semi final of Turkvizyon 2013 on 19 December, Bashkortostan performed third, and failed to qualify for the final.

2014

On 20 July 2014 it was announced that Bashkortostan would make their second appearance at the Turkvision Song Contest 2014, due to be held in Kazan, Tatarstan in November 2014. On 9 October 2014 the Bashkir broadcaster made a call for submissions for the contest. A total of 10 submissions were received by the broadcaster for the contest, and out of those submissions 9 singers were selected to go through to the final on 30 October 2014. The winner of the Bashkir national selection was decided by a nine-person jury. The group Zaman won the selection process with their song "Kubair". At the contest, Bashkortostan performed 17th in the semi final, scoring a total of 193 points and placing 4th, qualifying for the final. They then performed 6th in the final and finished in 3rd with a total of 199 points.

2015

On 16 June 2015 Bashkortostan confirmed that they would participate in Turkvision 2015. The selection process for Bashkortostan was announced on 13 October 2015. The channel in charge of the Bashkir participation changed from Kuray Television to Tugan Tel TV. The selection final was announced on 14 October 2015 as taking place at the Bashkortostan State Concert Hall on 11 November 2015, in which eight singers were selected to compete. Ziliya Bahtieva was selected by a professional jury to represent Bashkortostan in Istanbul. On 20 November 2015 Bashkortostan withdrew from Turkvision 2015, as they were instructed by the Russian Government not to compete in the contest due to the relations between Turkey and Russia at that present time.

2016

On 2 November 2016 Ziliya Bahtieva confirmed that she would represent Bashkortostan at the Turkvision Song Contest 2016. She confirmed that she would not perform the song that she won the regions 2015 selection with. On 25 November 2016 Zilija revealed that she would perform "Donya Mathur" in the Bashkir language. However, Bashkortostan's participation did not materialise due to the cancellation of the 2016 contest.

2020

On 6 December 2020, just two weeks before the 2020 contest, Bashkortostan's participation was confirmed. Ziliya Bahtieva was reselected to represent the region, and her song "Halkyma" was confirmed to be the song she would be participating with on 13 December 2020. At the final, she placed 17th with 174 points.

Participation overview

See also 
 Russia in the Turkvision Song Contest

References 

 
Countries in the Turkvision Song Contest